Rostamabad (also Romanized as Rostamābād) is a village in Zarjabad Rural District, Firuz District, Kowsar County, Ardabil Province, Iran. At the 2006 census, its population was 27, in 6 families.

References 

Tageo

Towns and villages in Kowsar County